Khaneqah-e Sofla may refer to:
 Khaneqah-e Sofla, Ardabil
 Khaneqah-e Sofla, East Azerbaijan
 Khaneqah-e Sofla, Kermanshah